Frumkes is a surname. Notable people with the surname include:

Lewis Frumkes, American educator, humorist, and writer
Roy Frumkes, American film director